Paul Kelly (born 14 December 1979) is an Irish hurler who plays for his local club Mullinahone and at senior level for the Tipperary county team. Recently he has transferred clubs to O'Loughlin Gaels club in Kilkenny but since 2010 he has returned to play for Mullinahone. He is noted for his versatility, playing in the backline, midfield and more recently in the forward line.

Early life
Paul Kelly was born in Mullinahone on the Tipperary-Kilkenny border in 1979. He is the older brother of Eoin Kelly. He was educated locally and attended Scoil Riain Killenaule Vocational School which has produced many Tipperary Hurlers.

Playing career

Club
Kelly played his club hurling with his native Mullinahone with whom he has won one County Senior Hurling medal in 2002. On 17 March 2008, it was announced that Kelly would join O'Loughlin Gaels (a Kilkenny club) for the upcoming club season. He later returned to Mullinahone. He won a Tipperary Intermediate Football Championship with them in 2011.

Inter-county
Kelly was quickly selected for inter-county duty with Tipperary.  He joined the Tipp minors at a relatively young age and went on to win an All-Ireland minor medal in 1996 and a Munster minor medal in 1997.  He won a Munster Under-21 medal in 1999.  Having joined the Tipperary senior hurling panel in 1998 he was a key member of the panel when the team won the National League, the Munster Championship and the All-Ireland Championship in 2001.  Kelly also won a Railway Cup medal with Munster in 2001.  Although not having much success with Tipperary in 2002 he received his first All-Star award.  Although losing out to Cork in the Munster Final in 2005, Kelly scored 7 points from his midfield position and was named RTÉ's 'man of the match.'  He claimed a further All-Star award in 2005, together with his brother Eoin.

Kelly has also won 2 Under-21 caps for Ireland in the Shinty Internationals against Scotland.
In April 2010, Kelly broke his ankle in a club match, jeopardising his participation in the 2010 All Ireland Senior Hurling Championship.

Coaching career
Kelly has been a hurling coach, managed the Mullinahone ladies' footballers and was appointed  as Dublin camogie manager on a three-year term in October 2022.

Honours

Team
Mullinahone
Tipperary Senior Hurling Championship (1): 2002

Tipperary
All-Ireland Senior Hurling Championship (1): 2001
Munster Senior Hurling Championship (2): 2001, 2009 
National Hurling League (2): 2001, 2008 
All-Ireland Minor Hurling Championship (1): 1996
Munster Minor Hurling Championship (1): 1996

Individual
Awards
All-Star Awards (2): 2002, 2005

References

1979 births
Living people
All Stars Awards winners (hurling)
Camogie managers
Dual players
Dublin county camogie team
Hurling coaches
Ladies' Gaelic football managers
Mullinahone Gaelic footballers
Mullinahone hurlers
O'Loughlin Gaels hurlers
Tipperary inter-county hurlers